Pila, officially the Municipality of Pila,  is a 3rd class municipality in the province of Laguna, Philippines. According to the 2020 census, it has a population of 54,613 people.

Pila is a third class municipality in the province of Laguna, Philippines. According to the 2010 census, it has a population of 46,534 people. Pila has a total land area of 31.2 km2. The town of Pila is the site for some well-preserved houses dating back to the Spanish period as well as the old Saint Anthony of Padua Parish Church, the first Antonine church in the Philippines. Don Felizardo Rivera, who donated his lands to the church and municipal government, is the recognized founder of Pila. He is the ancestor of prominent families in Pila surnamed Rivera, Relova, Agra and Álava.

This also served as a location for the reality show, The Amazing Race Asia 2; the ABS-CBN daytime drama hit series Be Careful With My Heart, and ABS-CBN primetime series Huwag Kang Mangamba.

History

Pre-Hispanic Pila
Pila and adjacent towns along the shores of Laguna de Bay are considered by archaeologists as one of the oldest settlements in the Philippines. The community is one of three such concentrations of population known archaeologically to have been in place before A.D. 1000.  Archaeologists recovered in Pinagbayanan potteries and artifacts that indicate considerable settlement in the area during the Late Tang Dynasty (900 A.D.).  Archaeologists also recovered ancient horse bones ending the debate on whether the Spaniards brought them or not. The scientists were able to uncover Philippines’ oldest crematorium in the same area.  It is worthwhile to note that the oldest Philippine document, the 900 A.D. Laguna Copperplate Inscription, mentioned Pila (as Pailah) twice and its ruler Jayadewa.
Pre-Hispanic Pila was one of the biggest barangay domains in Southern Luzon. Its leader was not only the local chief but also the regional datu. The bards of the shore towns of the Morong Peninsula across the lake from Pila sang of the exploits of Gat Salyan Maguinto, the “gold-rich” datu of Pila who extended his kingdom far and wide into their settlements. In fact, the greater territory was also called Pila. Wary of concentrating power on a noble Indio, the conquistadors later dismantled his realm and to avoid confusion, they changed the name of the Pila dependencies to Pililla, which means “minor Pila.” The original territory had encompassed the present towns of Morong (from which the town of Pililla or Pilang Morong separated in 1583); Baras (separated from Morong in 1588); Tanay (separated from Pililla in 1606); Jala-jala whose old name was also Pila (separated from Pililla in 1786) and Talim Island, which until now, has a sitio Pila. The descendants of Gat Salyan were also regarded as the founders of the other towns of the present province of Rizal.

Around 1375, due to some calamity of weather most probably flooding, the original seat of Pila had to be abandoned and the barangay transferred to Pagalangan, which signifies “the place of Reverence”. The Franciscan chronicler, Fray Juan Plasencia gathered that the datu of Pila, “ with his own gold” purchased the new site from another chief who had owned it and who thus moved to another place. The datu then farmed out the arable land among the nobles and the freemen who, in return, paid him an annual rent of a hundred ganta of rice

Even before the coming of the Spaniards, Pila was already noted for its spiritual ambiance. The center of the town was known as Pagalangan, which means “The Place of Reverence.”

Coming of the Franciscans

In 1571, the Spanish conquistadors, led by Don Juan de Salcedo, “discovered” Pila in Pagalangan after the “pacification” of Manila. On 14 November of the same year Miguel Lopez de Legazpi, the first Spanish governor-general, awarded the encomienda (tributes) of Pagalangan and other Laguna villages to Don Francisco de Herrera, a regidor (councilman) of Manila. With the reorganization of the encomiendas in 1575, the tributes of Pila were granted to Don Hernando Ramirez on 29 July.

The Franciscans arrived in 1578 to evangelize the people of Pila and soon afterward built a church dedicated to St. Anthony of Padua, the first Antonine house of worship in the Philippines. Due to the nobleness and mildness of the character of its inhabitants, the Spanish leadership honored the town with an exceptional title La Noble Villa de Pila, one of five villas named by the Spaniards in the 16th and 17th century in the Philippines. During this period, the demesne of Pila includes Victoria, Laguna, and Jala-Jala, Rizal.

The Franciscans established in Pila the second printing press in the Philippines in 1611 under the auspices of Tomas Pinpin and Domingo Loag. The press printed in 1613, Philippines’ oldest dictionary and the first book printed using the movable type, the Vocabulario de Lengua Tagala.  The book was written and compiled by Fray Pedro de San Buenaventura and printed by Tomas Pinpin, the Prince of Filipino printers. The book is twenty-seven years older than the Bay Psalm Book, the first book printed in the United States in 1640.

At the beginning of the 19th century, the town was transferred from Pagalangan to the present site of Santa Clara because of perennial flooding.

Geography

Barangays
Pila is politically subdivided into 17 barangays. In 1957, the sitio of Pinagbayanan was converted into a barrio.

 Aplaya
 Bagong Pook
 Bukal
 Bulilan Norte (Poblacion)
 Bulilan Sur (Poblacion)
 Concepcion
 Labuin
 Linga
 Masico
 Mojon
 Pansol
 Pinagbayanan
 San Antonio
 San Miguel
 Santa Clara Norte (Poblacion)
 Santa Clara Sur (Poblacion)
 Tubuan

Climate

Demographics

Economy

Landmarks

The National Historical Institute of the Philippines (now National Historical Commission of the Philippines) declared the town plaza and surrounding ancestral houses a National Historical Landmark on May 17, 2000, by NHI Resolution no. 2, series of 2002. It cited Pila as an early pre-Hispanic center of culture and trade in Laguna known as La Noble Villa de Pila and has been recognized as one of the country's more important archeological sites where clay potteries were discovered in excavations made in Pinagbayanan in 1967. The historic town of Pila is bounded by General Luna Street in the north, M. H. del Pilar Street in the east, Mabini Street in the south, and Bonifacio Street in the west, and including the Pila Elementary School, and the Juan Fuentes and Santiago Fernandez house.

Two years later, on July 9, 2002, the Roman Catholic Diocese of San Pablo proclaimed the parish church of San Antonio de Padua de Pila as the Diocesan Shrine of St. Anthony. According to Philippine historian, Dr. Luciano Santiago, it is the only town in the Philippines that is formally recognized as a historical site by both the church and the state.

National Shrine of San Antonio de Padua 

Formerly San Antonio de Padua Parish Church, the original Pila church was built in Pagalangan in the 1578 with Rev. Juan de Florencia serving as its first priest. The whole structure, including the convent, was completed in 1618. The church was then transferred to its present location at the town square in 1800 due to frequent flooding in the original town center. Transfer and reconstruction of the church was finished along with the convent in 1849. Both however, were severely damaged by an earthquake in 1880. It was once more built in the early 19th century after the damage caused by the earthquake. The church was luckily spared from the ravages of WWII.

Pila Church is among the Newest churches in Laguna. This is evident in its strong stone structure. Its red bell tower is one of its distinguishable features. The church is dedicated to Saint Anthony of Padua and it was declared by the Pontificate of Pope John Paul II as the Diocesan Shrine of the said saint on July 9, 2002. Inside, wood is prominently seen as the material of choice for the chairs and altar. The altar is a massive structure that holds a relic of St. Anthony's garment.

Pila Museum 
Pila Museum is one of the Municipal Museums in Laguna—the other one being in Paete. The museum is under the direct jurisdiction of the office of the mayor of Pila. It was built through the efforts of the Pila Historical Society Foundation, a group of concerned citizens that seek to preserve the cultural heritage of Pila. The museum was built on November 10, 1993, from funds raised by the foundation. The foundation was also responsible for securing the declaration of the town as a National Historical Landmark, which was granted in the year 2000. The declaration was formalized by the installation of a landmark in the middle of the open field adjacent to the museum on December 4, 2007, with former President Ramos as the guest of honor.

It occupies a part of the Pila Elementary School with an area of about 50 square meters. The majority of what is contained within are artifacts dating from the Chinese period like jars, plates and jugs. The rest of the exhibit consist of American period appliances like sewing machines, Bakelite telephones, and adding machines. Most of the Chinese period artifacts were dug from the Pinagbayanan Crematorium while others were donated by old families in the town.

The Elizalde family donated 250–300 specimens to the Pila museum—with the museum also donated by them. The contents of the museum were transferred to a heritage building in 1994. Some of the specimens given are the following:
 Celadon Dishes with fish motifs
 Qingbai and blue and white jarlets
 Lead-glazed water droppers and teapots
 Carabao figurines
 Brown wares
 Iron and glass bracelets
 Gold or copper colored beads and earrings

Old Ancestral Houses 

It is a common misconception that the old ancestral houses are Hispanic in design. According to the town's curator and tourism officer however, these houses were built during the early American period. A number of them are still in pristine condition, preserved by the descendants of the original owners of the house while some are converted into shops and cafés. A majority of the houses within the site are derelict but the town officials are taking action to restore these architectural treasures.

Some of the old ancestral houses:
 Casto Maceda / Concha Monserrat house
 Corazon Rivera House
 Jose Agra / Rosario Villarica house
 Teodora Alava House

Government

Municipal Hall

The Pila Municipal Hall is a small and quaint structure right in front of the Pila Church. It is distinguishable by its white paint scheme with red tiled roof and brown pillars. Outside is a statue of Rizal standing guard in memoriam to the national hero. The hall has been situated there since 1931 and has been renovated time and again.

The open field in front of the hall serves as a waiting spots for those with appointments to the mayor or any public official. Parking space is adequate and tricycles parked near the hall can be easily hailed to go about town.

As with any municipal hall, it houses the local post office, the assessor's office, the local internal revenue office, and health center. Unlike most municipal halls, the office of the Tourism officer is not located within but is stationed at the Pila Museum.

Archaeology 

Esso Standard Philippines and Elizalde Family Project funded an archaeological project along Laguna de Bay. It was supervised by Dr. Robert Fox and Mr. Avelino Legaspi of the Anthropology Department of the National Museum.

In total, there were ten excavations from May to October 1967. Talim Island, Balibago, and Rizal were the first to be excavated. It was followed by Pinagbayanan and Bagong Pook.  Pila and Lumban were the last site to be excavated. Three of the four sites mentioned exposed 153 graves aging from the 12th to 15th century.

Access to trade 
As a place situated along Laguna de Bay, Pila was an accessible area for foreign trade. Vessels filled with merchants carrying goods and services traded with the locals for their products.

Since Laguna de Bay is connected to Manila Bay, the geographical area covered by the trade before was wide.

The items retrieved from the area were of very good quality and expensive looking. This indicates that the people that once lived in Pila were wealthy.

Cremation activities 
Professor Henry Otley Beyer pointed out that cremation was once practiced in Novaliches. In Pila's case, the team members found traces of cremation practice in the site. In their data, 40% of the cremated remains were found to be buried in soil and the remaining 60% were found in medium-sized jars.

In Pinagbayanan, the cremation burials were secondary burials. In the first phase, the body is let alone to decompose. It is then followed by a ritual performance. The body is burned because, according to the belief of ancient people, the “spirit is as clean as though washed in gold" once the body is set on fire.

Stratigraphy of the Pinagbayanan Excavation 
Six major layers:
 Thin humus level of light brown soil, banana trees and young coconut trees are planted
 Compact, fine-grained, gray-brown, 10 cm thickness. No cultural materials found in this layer.
 Soft black loam rich with organic material, 15–20 cm below the surface. Sherds were also found here. Also, cremation burials and postholes were found, that is why it is thought of that this area was home for the ancient people and burial site. Animal remains of pigs and horses were recovered. A C14 date of 1375+-25 bp was obtained on a ceremonial burial.
 Medium-grained, reddish-brown, and sandy clay found in here shows that it is a burial ground. The fourth level is 85 centimeters.
 Compact, fine-grained, and sandy clay. Dated as part of the Iron Age.
 Water table and stable natural soil.

References

External links

 [ Philippine Standard Geographic Code]
 Philippine Census Information
 Local Governance Performance Management System

Municipalities of Laguna (province)
Populated places on Laguna de Bay